CCGS Sir Humphrey Gilbert was a Canadian Coast Guard light icebreaker and buoy tender and now a privately owned Arctic icebreaker Polar Prince. The ship entered service with the Department of Transport Marine Service in 1959 and transferred to the newly created Canadian Coast Guard in 1962, active until 1986. The icebreaker was sold to private interests in Newfoundland and the ship sat idle after 2001 until resold in 2009 to GTX Technology Canada Limited and renamed Polar Prince. Rebuilt, the icebreaker is now plying the waters of the Arctic Ocean. In 2017, the vessel was temporarily rechristened Canada C3 and used for a high-profile voyage around Canada's three maritime coasts as part of the nation's 150th anniversary.

Design and description
The vessel is powered by diesel-electric engines (DC/DC) driving two shafts turning fixed-pitch propellers creating .

Construction and career

Government service
The icebreaker was constructed by Davie Shipbuilding at their yard in Lauzon, Quebec with the yard number 614 and was launched on 29 October 1958. Sir Humphrey Gilbert, named for an early explorer of the Northwest Passage, was commissioned into the Department of Transport's Marine Service in June 1959. In 1962, all Marine Service icebreakers were transferred to the newly formed Canadian Coast Guard. The vessel was registered in Ottawa, Ontario and homeported at St. John's, Newfoundland and Labrador in the Newfoundland Region.

On 20 December 1963, the French vessel Douala transmitted a distress signal off the coast of Newfoundland. Sir Humphrey Gilbert had already been detailed to aid a fishing vessel in the Atlantic, but was redirected to Douala as the French ship was in danger of foundering. While heading to Douala a barge broke loose aboard the Coast Guard vessel, causing damage to the ship and it was some time before the barge could be secured due to icing conditions. The Coast Guard vessel was delayed in arriving on the scene by the barge and on 21 December, Douala sank. 19 crew members of Douala were rescued on 22 December, of which two died while returning to Newfoundland. 13 members of the crew died in the water.

In 1983, Sir Humphrey Gilbert became the test vessel for the Coast Guard's lay day crewing system. Under the lay day system, each ship has two crews which rotate on a 28-day interval. While on board the ship, the crew perform 12-hour work shifts, seven days a week. At the end of the 28-day interval, the crew rotates off the ship for a four-week break. The trials proved a success and the system was adopted fleet-wide.

Post government service

The ship was taken out of service in 2001 and handed over to Crown Assets Distribution. The vessel was renamed 2001–06 in 2001 and in 2002 Gilbert 1.

Polar Prince
In 2002, the icebreaker was sold to Puddister Trading Co. Ltd of St. John's and renamed Polar Prince. In 2002, the vessel was acquired by Star Line Inc. In 2005, the vessel was laid up at Clarenville, Newfoundland and Labrador and put up for sale by Star Line on eBay. The vessel was later sold to GX Technologies of Calgary, Alberta in 2009 and modernized.

Canada C3
In 2017, Polar Prince was chartered and (temporarily) rechristened Canada C3 for a high-profile summer-long, 15-leg cruise around Canada in celebration of Canada's 150th anniversary. The ship departed on 1 July from Toronto, Ontario, and sailed down the Saint Lawrence Seaway and St. Lawrence River to Halifax, Nova Scotia via the Northumberland Strait and the Canso Canal, then travelled north around Newfoundland, the Labrador coast, around Baffin Island and through the Northwest Passage, then around Alaska and down the Pacific coast through the Inside Passage, to Victoria, British Columbia. The journey lasted 150 days and included stops at numerous Aboriginal communities along the way.

References

Notes

Citations

Sources

External links
 Vessel at shipspotting.com
 Canada C3 - Coast to Coast to Coast

Sir Humphrey Gilbert
Ships built in Quebec
1958 ships